No Said Date is the debut studio album by American rapper and Wu-Tang Clan member Masta Killa. The album was released on June 1, 2004, by Nature Sounds. The album features guest appearances from Raekwon, Ghostface Killah, Streetlife, Prodigal Sunn, Killah Priest, Method Man, Ol' Dirty Bastard, Allah Real, Inspectah Deck, U-God, and GZA.

Critical reception
Prefix gave the album an 8.3/10 rating saying: "No Said Date hearkens naturally back to the independent glory of 36 Chambers in its recognizable beat-smithing and refreshing flow from one of Wu-Tang's least-known members." James Corne of RapReviews.com gave the album a 9/10, stating: "No Said Date is a near classic album that will hold a place in any listener's archive for a long time to come." HipHopSite.com claims that the album "ought to be enough to satisfy all but the most demanding Wu-Tang fans. And in a time where hip-hop hasn't seen a legitimately classic, well-rounded album in years, No Said Date holds up as a solid, entertaining and overall satisfying debut."

In popular culture
The songs "D.T.D.", "Digi Warfare", and "Old Man" appear in the video game, Saints Row.

Track listing

Personnel

Charts

References

Album chart usages for Billboard200
2004 debut albums
Albums produced by RZA
Albums produced by True Master
Albums produced by Mathematics
Masta Killa albums
Nature Sounds albums